Eupromera is a genus of longhorn beetles of the subfamily Lamiinae, containing the following species:

 Eupromera disparilis Galileo & Martins, 1995
 Eupromera gilmouri Fuchs, 1961
 Eupromera similis Breuning, 1940
 Eupromera spryana Westwood, 1846
 Eupromera zonula Galileo & Martins, 1995

References

Eupromerini